Henderson County is a county in the U.S. state of Kentucky. The county is located in western Kentucky on the Ohio River across from Evansville, Indiana. As of the 2020 census, the population was 44,793.  Its county seat is Henderson.

The county was formed in 1798 and named for Richard Henderson who purchased  of land from the Cherokee, part of which would later make up the county.

Henderson County lies within the West Kentucky Coal Field area. It is also part of the Evansville, IN-KY Metropolitan Statistical Area.

History
The Transylvania Co., also known as Richard Henderson & Co., in 1775 purchased from the Cherokees a large swath of wilderness between the Kentucky River and Cumberland River, encompassing approximately half of what would become Kentucky as well as a portion of northern Tennessee. Their intention was to establish a 14th colony to be called Transylvania Colony. To help attract people to purchase land and populate the region, Henderson & Co. hired pioneer, explorer, woodsman, and frontiersman Daniel Boone to lead settlers through Cumberland Gap and direct woodsmen to cut the Wilderness Road through the Kentucky forest. However, the Continental Congress declined to act on Transylvania Co.'s petition without the consent of Virginia and North Carolina, which laid claim to the disputed lands. 

In December 1778, Virginia's Assembly declared the Transylvania claim void. In compensation, Henderson and his partners received a grant of 200,000 acres on the Ohio River below the mouth of Green River. In 1797, the surviving Transylvania Company investors and heirs sent Samuel Hopkins and Thomas Allin to the Henderson Grant land to lay out a town and mark off land for the respective investors. The location they selected for the town was the site of an existing settlement that sat high above the Ohio River called Red Banks. The new town was subsequently named Henderson.

Henderson County was created out of Christian County in December 1798, and was officially established in May 1799. Henderson was designed as its county seat. The county initially encompassed a larger area than it does today. It was reduced in size when Hopkins County was formed in 1806, when Union County was established in 1811, and when Webster County was established in 1860.

In August 1799, serial killers Micajah and Wiley Harpe came to the house of Moses Stegall, near what is now Dixon in Webster County, and murdered his wife, child, and a visitor. Moses Stegall later tracked down the brothers, and killed Micajah Harpe, cutting off his head and hanging it in a tree as a warning to other outlaws. Wiley Harpe was captured and hanged four years later in Mississippi.

During the 19th century, a cultivar of dark tobacco raised in Henderson County became very popular in Great Britain and continental Europe. Henderson became the largest dark-tobacco market in the world, generating considerable wealth in Henderson County. Around 1880, Henderson had 17 stemmeries in the city and 18 in the county. Stemmeries were where tobacco was stripped from its stem and made ready for use.  However, tobacco production in Henderson County declined through the 20th century and early 21st century, with few farmers still raising the labor-intensive crop. 

A peninsula across the Ohio from Henderson, which now forms Union Township, Vanderburgh County, Indiana, was the subject of Handly's Lessee v. Anthony, a U.S. Supreme Court case in 1820.  An area known as "Green River Island" is part of Kentucky, even though it is on the Indiana side of the Ohio River.  The Ellis Park Race Course is located there.

A workplace shooting occurred at an Atlantis Plastics factory in Henderson, Kentucky, United States on June 25, 2008. The gunman, 25-year-old Wesley Neal Higdon, shot and killed five people and critically injured a sixth, before taking his own life. The mass murder is the worst in the history of Henderson County, surpassing the triple homicides that took place in 1799 and 1955.

Geography
The county's northern border with Indiana is mostly formed by the Ohio River, though some of the county lies north of the river.

Adjacent counties
 Posey County, Indiana  (northwest)
 Vanderburgh County, Indiana  (north)
 Warrick County, Indiana  (northeast)
 Daviess County  (east)
 McLean County  (southeast)
 Webster County  (south)
 Union County  (west)

Demographics

As of the census of 2000, there were 44,829 people, 18,095 households, and 12,576 families residing in the county. The racial makeup of the county was 91.16% White, 7.10% Black or African American, 0.16% Native American, 0.33% Asian, 0.01% Pacific Islander, 0.39% from other races, and 0.86% from two or more races. Hispanic or Latino of any race were 0.97% of the population.

There were 18,095 households, out of which 32.40% had children under the age of 18 living with them, 54.40% were married couples living together, 11.60% had a female householder with no husband present, and 30.50% were non-families. 26.40% of all households were made up of individuals, and 10.60% had someone living alone who was 65 years of age or older.  The average household size was 2.43 and the average family size was 2.93.

In the county, the population was spread out, with 24.60% under the age of 18, 8.40% from 18 to 24, 30.00% from 25 to 44, 23.90% from 45 to 64, and 13.10% who were 65 years of age or older.  The median age was 37 years. For every 100 females, there were 93.60 males.  For every 100 females age 18 and over, there were 90.60 males.

The median income for a household in the county was $35,892, and the median income for a family was $44,703. Males had a median income of $33,838 versus $22,572 for females. The per capita income for the county was $18,470.  About 9.70% of families and 12.30% of the population were below the poverty line, including 17.20% of those under age 18 and 10.10% of those age 65 or over.

Communities

Cities
 Corydon
 Henderson (county seat)
 Robards

Census-designated places
 Anthoston
 Poole (partially in Webster County)
 Spottsville

Other unincorporated places

 Alzey
 Baskett
 Bluff City
 Cairo
 Dixie
 Finley Addition
 Geneva
 Graham Hill
 Hebbardsville
 Niagara
 Reed
 Smith Mills
 Weaverton
 Wilson
 Zion

Ghost town
 Scuffletown

Notable people
 Happy Chandler, 44th and 49th governor of Kentucky, was born in the farming community of Corydon, Kentucky, in 1898.
 John James Audubon, ornithologist, painter and naturalist, lived in Henderson from 1810 to 1819.
 W. C. Handy, a musician and composer who became known as the Father of the Blues, lived in Henderson during the 1890s, performing in bands. 
 Ewing Galloway, a journalist and one-time county prosecutor, was born in Little Dixie, Kentucky, 1880.
 Kentucky clergyman and university president LaVerne Butler was born in Henderson County in 1926.
 Country entertainer Grandpa Jones, born in 1913 in the small farming community of Niagara, Kentucky.
 Marine Corporal Luther Skaggs Jr., born in Henderson, Kentucky, in 1923.
 Command Sergeant Major Gary L. Littrell, born in Henderson in 1944.

Politics

See also

 National Register of Historic Places listings in Henderson County, Kentucky

References

 
Kentucky counties
Kentucky counties on the Ohio River
1798 establishments in Kentucky
Evansville metropolitan area
Populated places established in 1798